Robbing Cleopatra's Tomb (literally Cleopatra) was an 1899 short silent film directed by Georges Méliès. One of the earliest horror films ever made, it is about resurrecting the mummy of Cleopatra. In it, a man chops the mummy of Cleopatra into pieces, and then "produces a woman from a smoking brazier."

While today director Méliès is more known for his iconic film A Trip to the Moon, it was this film which caught the attention of producer Charles Urban, who released the film in America (under the title Robbing Cleopatra's Tomb; its English release was simply titled Cleopatra's Tomb) and subsequently distributed many of Méliès other films.

This is a lost film. A print was reported to have been discovered in France on 22 September 2005, but it turned out to be a different film involving tomb robbery.

References

External links

1899 films
1899 horror films
French black-and-white films
French silent short films
Films directed by Georges Méliès
Depictions of Cleopatra on film
Mummy films
Lost horror films
Lost French films
French horror films
1890s lost films
1899 short films
Silent horror films
1890s French films
Resurrection in film